PT. Indonesia AirAsia Extra (operated as Indonesia AirAsia X) was a joint venture of Malaysian long haul low-fare airline AirAsia X and Indonesia AirAsia. The airline ceased all operations on 14 January 2019.

History
Indonesia AirAsia X is the medium and long-haul operation of the brand Indonesia AirAsia. The franchise keeps costs down by using a common ticketing system, aircraft livery, employee uniforms, and management style. It served two scheduled long haul international flights from Bali's I Gusti Ngurah Rai International Airport to Mumbai and Tokyo until they were both ceased. It also served short haul flights using an Airbus A320-200 from Jakarta, Denpasar and Surabaya, replacing some of Indonesia AirAsia's flights.

Indonesia AirAsia X planned to launch its first destination to Melbourne on 26 December 2014, but had not achieved authorisation from both the Australian or Indonesian governments to fly the route. This led to huge disruption to passengers during the peak holiday season, with many flights delayed or cancelled outright. In January 2015, Taipei was announced as the airline's first route from Bali. The inaugural flight was commenced on 19 January 2015, but ended flights in September 2015.

In late November 2018, the airline announced that it would be ceasing scheduled operations beginning in January 2019. The carrier was still to remain in operation, but would operate as a non-scheduled commercial airline going forward. The airline operated its last scheduled flight to Tokyo on 14 January 2019. Indonesia AirAsia X later ceased all operations on October 17, 2020 and was liquidated as part of the restructuring of AirAsia X along with AirAsia Japan which also ceased the same over similar reason.

Destinations
Indonesia AirAsia X operated to the following destinations before it ceased operations in January 2019.
Indonesia
 Denpasar - Ngurah Rai International Airport, hub
 Jakarta - Soekarno Hatta International Airport, main hub

Former destinations
Australia
 Melbourne - Melbourne Airport
 Sydney - Kingsford Smith Airport
India
 Mumbai - Chhatrapati Shivaji Maharaj International Airport
Indonesia
 Surabaya - Juanda International Airport,
 Surakarta - Adisumarmo International Airport
 Yogyakarta - Adisucipto International Airport
Japan
 Tokyo - Narita International Airport
Malaysia
 Johor Bahru - Senai International Airport
 Kuala Lumpur - Kuala Lumpur International Airport
 Penang - Bayan Lepas International Airport
Saudi Arabia
 Jeddah - King Abdulaziz International Airport
Thailand
 Bangkok - Don Mueang International Airport
Taiwan
 Taipei - Taoyuan International Airport

Fleet

The Indonesia AirAsia X fleet comprised two Airbus A330-300s. In addition, Indonesia AirAsia X had also operated 5 Airbus A320-200s to fulfil the Indonesian government regulation for a new airline to operate at least 10 aircraft within its first year of operation. The aircraft were transferred back to Indonesia AirAsia in October 2018.

The Indonesia AirAsia X fleet comprised the following aircraft (as of August 2019):

See also
 AirAsia
 AirAsia X
 Indonesia AirAsia
 Tune Ventures
 Transport in Indonesia

References

External links

 Official website

Defunct airlines of Indonesia
Defunct low-cost airlines
Airlines established in 2014
Airlines disestablished in 2019
2019 disestablishments in Indonesia
AirAsia
Indonesian companies established in 2014